Admiral Arbuthnot may refer to:

Charles Ramsay Arbuthnot (1850–1913), British Royal Navy admiral
Geoffrey Arbuthnot (1885–1957), British Royal Navy vice admiral
Mariot Arbuthnot (1711–1794), British Royal Navy admiral
Sir Robert Arbuthnot, 4th Baronet (1864–1916), British Royal Navy rear admiral

See also
Alexander Dundas Young Arbuthnott (c. 1789–1871), British Royal Navy rear admiral